The World Cup is a solid gold trophy that is awarded to the winners of the FIFA World Cup association football tournament. Since the advent of the World Cup in 1930, two trophies have been used: the Jules Rimet Trophy from 1930 to 1970, before the FIFA World Cup Trophy from 1974 to the present day. It is one of the most expensive trophies in sporting history, valued at $250,000.

The first trophy, originally named Victory, but later renamed in honour of FIFA president Jules Rimet, was made of gold plated sterling silver and lapis lazuli. It depicted Nike, the Greek goddess of victory. Brazil won the trophy outright in 1970, prompting the commissioning of a replacement. The original Jules Rimet Trophy was stolen in 1983 and never recovered.

The subsequent trophy, called the "FIFA World Cup Trophy", was introduced in 1974. Made of 18 karat gold with bands of malachite on its base, it stands 36.8 centimetres high and weighs 6.175 kilograms (30,875 carats). The trophy was made by the Stabilimento Artistico Bertoni company in Italy. It depicts two human figures holding up the Earth. The current holders of the trophy are Argentina, winners of the 2022 World Cup.

Jules Rimet Trophy

The Jules Rimet Trophy was the original prize for winning the FIFA World Cup. Originally called "Victory", but generally known simply as the World Cup or Coupe du Monde, it was renamed in 1946 to honour the FIFA President Jules Rimet, who in 1929 passed a vote to initiate the competition. It was designed by French sculptor Abel Lafleur and made of gold-plated sterling silver on a lapis lazuli base. In 1954 the base was replaced with a taller version to accommodate more winner's details. It stood 35 centimetres (14 in) high and weighed 3.8 kilograms (8.4 lb).
It comprised a decagonal cup, supported by a winged figure representing Nike, the ancient Greek goddess of victory. The Jules Rimet Trophy was taken to Uruguay for the first FIFA World Cup aboard the Conte Verde, which set sail from Villefranche-sur-Mer, just southeast of Nice, in June 1930. This was the same ship that carried Jules Rimet and the footballers representing France, Romania, and Belgium who were participating in the tournament that year. The first team to be awarded the trophy was Uruguay, the winners of the 1930 World Cup.

During World War II, the trophy was held by 1938 champion Italy. Ottorino Barassi, the Italian vice-president of FIFA and president of FIGC, secretly transported the trophy from a bank in Rome and hid it in a shoe-box under his bed to prevent the Nazis from taking it. The 1958 FIFA World Cup in Sweden marked the beginning of a tradition regarding the trophy. As Brazilian captain Hilderaldo Bellini heard photographers' requests for a better view of the Jules Rimet Trophy, he lifted it up in the air. Every Cup-winning captain ever since has repeated the gesture.

On 20 March 1966, four months before the 1966 FIFA World Cup in England, the trophy was stolen during a public exhibition at Westminster Central Hall. It was found seven days later wrapped in newspaper at the bottom of a suburban garden hedge in Beulah Hill, Upper Norwood, South London, by a black and white mongrel dog named Pickles.

As a security measure, The Football Association secretly manufactured a replica of the trophy for use in exhibitions rather than the original. This replica was used on occasions up until 1970 when the original trophy had to be handed back to FIFA for the next competition. Since FIFA had explicitly denied the FA permission to create a replica, the replica also had to disappear from public view and was for many years kept under its creator's bed. This replica was sold at an auction in 1997 for £254,500, when it was purchased by FIFA. The high auction price, ten times the reserve price of £20,000–£30,000, was led by speculation that the auctioned trophy was not the replica trophy but the original itself. Testing by FIFA confirmed the auctioned trophy was a replica. Soon afterwards FIFA arranged for the replica to be lent for display at the English National Football Museum, which was then based in Preston but is now in Manchester.

The Brazilian team won the tournament for the third time in 1970, allowing them to keep the real trophy in perpetuity, as had been stipulated by Jules Rimet in 1930. It was put on display at the Brazilian Football Confederation headquarters in Rio de Janeiro, in a cabinet with a front of bullet-proof glass.

On 19 December 1983, the wooden rear of the cabinet was opened by force with a crowbar and the cup was stolen again. Four men were tried and convicted in absentia for the crime. The trophy has never been recovered, and it is widely believed to have been melted down and sold. Only one piece of the Jules Rimet Trophy has been found, the original base, which FIFA had kept in a basement of the federation's Zürich headquarters prior to 2015.

The Confederation commissioned a replica of their own, made by Eastman Kodak, using  of gold. This replica was presented to Brazilian military president João Figueiredo in 1984.

New trophy 

A replacement trophy was commissioned by FIFA for the 1974 World Cup. Fifty-three submissions were received from sculptors in seven countries. Italian artist Silvio Gazzaniga was awarded the commission. Chemist Sir Martyn Poliakoff claims that the trophy is hollow, because if it were solid gold, the trophy would weigh  and would be too heavy to lift. This is easy to understand since 18 k gold is an alloy made of 18 parts of gold, 5 parts of silver and 1 part of copper with a mean density of 15.6 gr/cm3. The trophy weighs 6175 g, this amount of alloy is just a volume of 390 cm3 or, in other words, would be a cube with a side of 7.3 cm, and the World Cup is clearly larger. This argumentation proves that the World Cup is indeed hollow. Moreover, its original manufacturer, who is the same that makes the official replicas, confirmed this characteristic.

Produced by Bertoni, Milano in Paderno Dugnano, it depicts two human figures holding up the Earth. Gazzaniga described the trophy thus, "The lines spring out from the base, rising in spirals, stretching out to receive the world. From the remarkable dynamic tensions of the compact body of the sculpture rise the figures of two athletes at the stirring moment of victory".

The trophy has the engraving "FIFA World Cup" on its base. After the 1994 FIFA World Cup, a plate was added to the bottom side of the trophy where the names of winning countries are engraved, names therefore not visible when the trophy is standing upright. The original trophy is now permanently kept at the FIFA World Football Museum in Zurich, Switzerland. It only leaves there when it goes on its FIFA World Cup Trophy Tour. It is present at the Final draw for the next World Cup, and on the pitch at the World Cup opening game and Final. The FIFA World Cup Trophy Tour was inaugurated for the 2006 FIFA World Cup competition.

The Cup used to be kept by the winning team until the final draw of the next tournament, however, that is no longer the case. Instead the winners of the tournament receive a bronze replica which is gold-plated rather than solid gold. The inscriptions state the year in figures and the name of the winning nation in its national language. For example, "1974 " or "1994 ". In 2010, the name of the winning nation was engraved as "2010 Spain", in English, not in Spanish. This was corrected in the new plate made after the 2018 World Cup.

As of 2022, twelve winners have been engraved on the base. The plate is replaced each World Cup cycle and the names of the trophy winners are rearranged into a spiral to accommodate future winners. FIFA's regulations now state that the trophy, unlike its predecessor, cannot be won outright: the winners of the tournament receive a bronze replica which is gold-plated rather than solid gold. Germany became the first nation to win the new trophy for the third time when they won the 2014 FIFA World Cup. Argentina became the second nation to achieve this feat following their win in Qatar at the 2022 FIFA World Cup.

Eventual replacement 
Since the base of the trophy only has space for new engravings to be made up until the 2038 World Cup, a new trophy will eventually be made for the 2042 World Cup.

Winners

Historic list of all holders of the trophy (winners of the FIFA World Cup).

Jules Rimet Trophy
  – 1958, 1962, 1970
  – 1930, 1950
  – 1934, 1938
  – 1954
  – 1966

FIFA World Cup Trophy
  /  – 1974, 1990, 2014
  – 1978, 1986, 2022
  – 1982, 2006
  – 1994, 2002
  – 1998, 2018
  – 2010

See also

References

External links

 The story of the 1966 theft The Observer
 FIFA Trophies (PDF) (archived, 24 Feb 2020)
 Official website of Silvio Gazzaniga, the sculptor of the trophy
 
FIFA World Cup 2022 All Matches Time

Awards established in 1974
Trophy
World Cup Trophy
Gold objects